Angraecum borbonicum is a species of orchid found in Réunion.

References

External links 

borbonicum
Orchids of Réunion
Endemic flora of Réunion